Mel Mitchell III (born February 10, 1979) is a former American football safety. He was drafted by the New Orleans Saints in the fifth round of the 2002 NFL Draft. He played college football at Western Kentucky.

Mitchell also played for the New England Patriots.

College career
At Western Kentucky University, Mitchell started all 36 games and totaling 288 tackles, seven interceptions, 1.5 sacks, 21 passes defensed, and returned 20 kickoffs. He majored in physical education.

References

External links
New England Patriots bio

1979 births
Living people
People from Rockledge, Florida
Players of American football from Florida
African-American players of American football
American football safeties
Western Kentucky Hilltoppers football players
New Orleans Saints players
New England Patriots players
21st-century African-American sportspeople
20th-century African-American sportspeople